

Boston Court Pasadena (also known as The Theatre at Boston Court) is a Regional theatre noted for its productions of new works.  Located in Pasadena, California, it houses a 99-seat theatre for its mainstage productions, as well as a 80-seat black box theatre.

History
The theatre was founded in 2003 with a grant from philanthropist Z. Clark Branson. Directors Jessica Kubzansky and Michael Michetti were named co-artistic directors.

In 2019, Kubzansky was named sole Artistic Director.

The organization has been honored numerous times, including Ovation, Los Angeles Drama Critics Circle, and Stage Raw Awards, as well as being a two-time recipient of the National Theatre Company Award from the American Theatre Wing.

References
Notes

External links
Boston Court Pasadena

Theatre in Los Angeles